Townsend Township is one of the twelve townships of Sandusky County, Ohio, United States.  As of the 2000 census, 1,670 people lived in the township.

Geography
Located in the northeastern corner of the county, it borders the following townships:
Margaretta Township, Erie County - northeast
Groton Township, Erie County - southeast
York Township - south
Green Creek Township - southwest corner
Riley Township - west

No municipalities are located in Townsend Township, although the census-designated places of Vickery and Whites Landing are located in the township's west and north.

Name and history
Statewide, the only other Townsend Township is located in Huron County.

Government
The township is governed by a three-member board of trustees, who are elected in November of odd-numbered years to a four-year term beginning on the following January 1. Two are elected in the year after the presidential election and one is elected in the year before it. There is also an elected township fiscal officer, who serves a four-year term beginning on April 1 of the year after the election, which is held in November of the year before the presidential election. Vacancies in the fiscal officership or on the board of trustees are filled by the remaining trustees.

References

External links
County website

Townships in Sandusky County, Ohio
Townships in Ohio